The 2007 Stanley Cup Finals was the championship series of the National Hockey League's (NHL) 2006–07 season, and the culmination of the 2007 Stanley Cup playoffs. It was contested between the Western Conference champion Anaheim Ducks and the Eastern Conference champion Ottawa Senators. It was the second appearance in the Finals for Anaheim since 2003 (known at the time as the Mighty Ducks of Anaheim), when they lost to the New Jersey Devils. It was the first appearance for the Senators since entering the NHL as an expansion team in 1992. Anaheim defeated Ottawa in five games and were awarded their first Stanley Cup becoming the eleventh post-1967 expansion team to win the NHL championship trophy, and the first Stanley Cup championship for a team from California (the Los Angeles Kings would eventually win Stanley Cups in 2012 and 2014). This was also the last Finals in which both teams were seeking their first Stanley Cup until 2018, as well as the fifth straight Finals to feature a team vying for its first Stanley Cup.

Brothers Scott and Rob Niedermayer both played for the Ducks team, becoming the first set of brothers to win the Stanley Cup together since Duane and Brent Sutter accomplished the feat twice with the New York Islanders in 1982 and 1983.

Paths to the Finals

Prior to the season, the Ducks had been the pick of many in the media to make it to the Final, and they did not disappoint. The second-seeded Anaheim Ducks defeated both the Minnesota Wild and Vancouver Canucks in five games before defeating their rivals the Detroit Red Wings in six games in the Western Conference Final. The Ducks had the most penalties out of any team during the post-season and had one suspension going into the final, but had a top penalty-kill percentage. They were led by two Norris Trophy candidates captain Scott Niedermayer and Chris Pronger, the scoring touches of Andy McDonald, Teemu Selanne, Ryan Getzlaf, and the goaltending of Jean-Sebastien Giguere. The Ducks were looking to shut down Ottawa's offense with the checking line of Rob Niedermayer, Samuel Pahlsson and Travis Moen, and overall team defence.

The fourth-seeded Ottawa Senators defeated the Pittsburgh Penguins, and upset both the New Jersey Devils and Buffalo Sabres, all in five games apiece, en route to their first Eastern Conference championship. Ottawa was led by the top line of captain Daniel Alfredsson, Dany Heatley, and Jason Spezza, who combined for 23 goals in the first three rounds, and the goaltending of Ray Emery. Other Senators who played pivotal roles were forwards Mike Fisher and Dean McAmmond and defencemen Chris Phillips and Anton Volchenkov. The Senators were looking to work past Anaheim's defence with their speed and higher-scoring offence, although both teams played a similar style of responsible team defence.

Anaheim had home ice advantage for the series, as they finished the regular season with 110 points to Ottawa's 105. The attention leading into the finals was Ottawa being "Canada's Team" despite Anaheim having five more Canadian skaters than the Senators. Many fans were saying that the Stanley Cup needed to be brought back to Canada after a 14-year drought (up to that point, the last Canadian team to hoist the Stanley Cup was the 1993 Montreal Canadiens, who defeated the Los Angeles Kings).

Game summaries
Only four players remained on the Ducks roster from 2003, including the Conn Smythe Trophy winner, Jean-Sebastien Giguere. The 2003 club's general manager, Bryan Murray, was now the Ottawa head coach.

Two Ottawa-area players were in the finals, playing for the Ducks.

The Senators and Ducks had never met in the playoffs before, and had not played each other since January 19, 2006, when the Ducks (then known as the Mighty Ducks) won 4–3 in a shootout in Ottawa.

Historical facts
This was the first time since the 1925 Victoria Cougars that a team from the west coast of North America won the Stanley Cup, and the first time an NHL team from the west coast had done so. The Ducks are the fourth west coast team to win the Cup, and the first from California.

Senators captain Daniel Alfredsson, from Sweden, was the first European-born-and-raised captain to lead his team to the finals. Previously, only Canadians or an American had captained teams in the finals. The Ducks were captained by a Canadian (Scott Niedermayer) and had more Canadian players than the Senators.

As of the end of the 2021 playoffs, the Senators remain the only Canadian team to represent the East in the finals since 1993 (the 2021 Montreal Canadiens did not represent the East in the 2021 Stanley Cup Finals due to temporary abolishment of the conferences).  These finals marked the third straight in which a Canadian franchise lost against a franchise based in the southern half of the United States (previous Canadian teams in the last few Stanley Cup Finals were the 2004 Calgary Flames and the 2006 Edmonton Oilers, and not counting the 2004–05 NHL season lockout).

The series marked the first time that two teams from the early-'90s expansion era faced each other in the final. (Anaheim had started play in 1993, Ottawa in 1992)

It was the first finals since 1999 where neither finalist had won the Stanley Cup previously (the NHL does not recognize the championships of the original Ottawa Senators as part of the current franchise's history).

As well, this was the third season in a row that the Cup was won by a team winning its first Cup after Tampa Bay in 2004 and Carolina in 2006.
It was also the 1st finals since the 2002 Stanley Cup Finals, when Detroit defeated Carolina in 5 games, that didn't need a 7th game after New Jersey in 2003, Tampa Bay in 2004, and Carolina in 2006 all won in 7 games

The third game, in Ottawa on June 2, was attended by 91-year-old Russell Williams as a guest of the Senators. He had attended the last Finals game in Ottawa (April 13, 1927) versus the Boston Bruins in the old Ottawa Auditorium. His presence was a good-luck charm, as Ottawa won the game he attended.

Sens Mile

Much like the Red Mile in Calgary during the Flames' 2004 cup run and the Blue Mile in Edmonton during the Oilers' 2006 Cup run, Ottawa Senators fans took to the streets to celebrate their team's success. The idea to have a Sens Mile began as a grassroots campaign on Facebook by Ottawa residents before game four of the Ottawa-Buffalo Eastern Conference Finals series.
Their idea was to use Elgin Street as a gathering place for Sens fans to celebrate after games won. Since Scotiabank Place (now Canadian Tire Centre) is located in suburban Ottawa, spontaneous celebration did not occur during the Senators' Cup run until that point, like it did in Calgary and Edmonton where the arenas are located more centrally.

When the Senators beat the Sabres in game five of the Eastern Conference Final, people flocked to Elgin Street in celebration.

For the Stanley Cup Final, large video screens were installed at Ottawa City Hall for fans to view. After the Senators won game three of the final, fans celebrated on Elgin Street once again, and Ottawa Police closed the street down.

Game one

The scene was festive at Honda Center in Anaheim with several Hollywood celebrities on hand, including former movie star and then California Governor, Arnold Schwarzenegger, who dropped the puck for the ceremonial face-off. As in their previous series, the Senators struck first. Mike Fisher started off the scoring in the series with a power-play goal 1:38 into the first period that travelled high in the air, landed behind Giguere and trickled over the line. Although Ottawa scored first, Anaheim took over play during the course of the period. The Ducks replied nine minutes later with a goal from Andy McDonald at even strength. Ottawa was unable to get even one shot on goal in the last eleven minutes of the first, and the period ended with the score tied 1–1. The shots were 8–3 for Anaheim. Early into the second, Wade Redden scored the only goal of the period, another power-play goal for Ottawa from the blue line, putting the Senators up 2–1. Play was even for the most part, as indicated by the 10–10 shot total of the period. The Ducks dominated most of the play in the third, tying the game 2–2 at five minutes into the third on a goal from Ryan Getzlaf, followed by a dramatic game-winning goal by Travis Moen with three minutes left in the third. The shots ended 32–20 in Anaheim's favour. In 2009, it was disclosed by Tom Molloy, hockey coach and friend of Dany Heatley, that Heatley was injured by a cross-check of Chris Pronger in this game. Heatley would continue to play for the rest of the series and the injury was kept secret. Heatley would score only one goal in the series.

Game two

Strong defence and goaltending from both sides kept scoring down to nothing until Samuel Pahlsson scored the game-winning goal for the Ducks 14:16 into the third period. Once again, Anaheim's checking line of Samuel Pahlsson, Travis Moen, and Rob Niedermayer managed to shut down and out-score the Ottawa top line of Daniel Alfredsson, Dany Heatley, and Jason Spezza. Anaheim again led the shot count with 31 shots to Ottawa's 16. Ray Emery in the Ottawa net played his best game of the series.

Game three

Play now switched to Ottawa, for the first Stanley Cup Finals game in Ottawa in 80 years (as well as the first Finals game played in the province of Ontario for the first time in 40 years). The Senators hoped to regroup, being down 2–0, with two wins at home.

After an energetic crowd took over the singing of O Canada from Ontario Provincial Police Constable Lyndon Slewidge, the Senators came out tentative and Andy McDonald opened the scoring in game three to give Anaheim a 1–0 lead 5:39 into the first period. Ottawa replied 11 minutes later with a goal by Chris Neil.

Corey Perry scored to give Anaheim a 2–1 lead at 5:20 in the second; the lead was short-lived, as Mike Fisher scored 27 seconds later. Two minutes later, Ryan Getzlaf scored to once again give Anaheim a one-goal advantage. Ottawa then replied with a goal by Daniel Alfredsson.

Alfredsson's goal was initially waved off by referees because the puck went in off his skate, appearing to have been kicked in. The NBC broadcasters thought the goal would be waved off. But the officials reviewing the goal ruled that there was no kicking motion and allowed the goal to stand, tying the game once again. NHL rules allow the redirection of a puck with the foot, as long as no kicking motion is involved, and this was the ruling.

Later in the period, Dean McAmmond got credited with a goal that ricocheted off Chris Pronger's stick. Near the beginning of the third period, McAmmond was injured after receiving an elbow to the head from Pronger, in what might have been retribution for the goal, as McAmmond's shot had appeared to have been aimed at Pronger, and not at the net. As in the previous series against Detroit (in which he delivered a similar blow to Detroit's Tomas Holmstrom), Pronger was not penalized during the game for his hit on McAmmond, but was later suspended for game four. Pronger claimed the elbow was accidental and the Ducks did not appeal the suspension. McAmmond did not return to play in the series, and this was a loss for the Senators as he had been an effective player.

Anton Volchenkov scored midway through the third to give the Senators a two-goal lead. Neither team scored any goals through the balance of the period, and Ottawa won the game 5–3, their first and only win in the Stanley Cup Finals, as of 2022.

Game four

The national anthems were sung by Ottawa native Alanis Morissette, who also sang the anthem prior to the first game in October, 1992 of the Senators. The audience again took over the singing of "O Canada."

Anaheim Ducks defenceman Chris Pronger was suspended for game four because of an elbow he delivered to the head of Senator Dean McAmmond in game three. Once again, the Ducks had to deal with the loss of Pronger while the Senators were itching to win both home games and tie the series.

After nearly a full period of scoreless play, Daniel Alfredsson scored at 19:59 (0.3 seconds remained) of the first to give the Senators a 1–0 lead on a powerplay goal. The momentum seemed to continue shifting from game three in Ottawa's favor as Anaheim could only get two shots the entire period.

In the second, the Ducks replied with two goals by Andy McDonald midway through the period to put them up 2–1. Ottawa came back with two minutes left in the period to tie the game 2–2 on a goal from Dany Heatley, his only goal of the series.

The game's most controversial moment came in the final five seconds of the second period. With the puck at center ice, Alfredsson shot the puck, which hit Scott Niedermayer. The incident appeared intentional, although Alfredsson claimed after the game that it was not. Niedermayer was not injured, but the Ducks were furious, sparking a post-buzzer scrum next to the Anaheim bench before the teams left the ice for the intermission. To the surprise of NBC's broadcasters, Alfredsson was not penalized for his actions, but Mike Fisher and Samuel Pahlsson were each handed matching minors for roughing.

The Ducks responded to the incident on the score board as Dustin Penner scored at 4:07 of the third to provide the winning 3–2 Anaheim margin, putting them up 3–1 in the series and provided an opportunity for the Ducks to clinch the Cup in game five.

Game five

The Ducks' home crowd at Honda Center booed every time Daniel Alfredsson touched the puck in response to Alfredsson's controversial shot at Scott Niedermayer in game four, although this did not appear to put him off his game as he scored two goals. However, his play was the only bright spot on the night for the Senators.

The final game was marked by strong play by the Ducks, and mistakes and bad luck for the Senators, as they attempted to stave off elimination and seemed to try too hard, while the Ducks played with confidence and without mistakes. The game was played 'close-to-the-vest', with only 31 shots on goal by the two teams.

In the first period, Andy McDonald and Rob Niedermayer of Anaheim scored the first and second goals, respectively. McDonald's goal came on the power play on a penalty to Ottawa for obstruction; the call that the Senators had claimed was not being called against the Ducks. The goal went off the skate of Chris Phillips, the start of an unlucky night for the Ottawa defenceman. Niedermayer's goal deflated the Senators further as it appeared that Emery should have stopped it.

In the second period, Senators captain Daniel Alfredsson cut the lead to 2–1.  However, the turning point of the game came when Chris Phillips and Ray Emery were involved in a mix-up resulting in an own goal, which was awarded to Travis Moen, giving Anaheim a 3–1 lead.

Later in the period, Alfredsson scored a 'highlight-reel' short-handed goal to close the gap to 3–2. It appeared that he was trying to carry the whole team on his back, but on the same power play, defenceman Francois Beauchemin scored moments later to restore the Ducks two-goal lead, 4–2. Beauchemin's goal deflected off the shin pad of Ottawa defenceman Anton Volchenkov, the NHL's leading shot blocker, who was attempting to block the shot, behind Emery.

In the third period, Travis Moen scored to give Anaheim a commanding 5–2 lead. The Senators kept trying, and Antoine Vermette was awarded a rare penalty shot; however the puck rolled off his stick at the last moment. Corey Perry scored the final goal off of a loose pass by Ottawa to provide the winning margin of 6–2, and, with the exception of Scott Niedermayer, every member of the Ducks franchise won their first Stanley Cup.

Team rosters
Years indicated in boldface under the "Finals appearance" column signify that the player won the Stanley Cup in the given year.

Anaheim Ducks

Ottawa Senators

Stanley Cup engraving
The 2007 Stanley Cup was presented to Ducks captain Scott Niedermayer by NHL Commissioner Gary Bettman following the Ducks 6–2 win over the Senators in game five.

The following Ducks players and staff had their names engraved on the Stanley Cup

2006–07 Anaheim Ducks

Television and ratings
The 2007 Stanley Cup Finals was also notable for its exceptionally poor television ratings in the United States. Games one and two were carried by cable channel Versus, then a new and little known player on the sports television scene. Game one produced a 0.5 national rating or 523,000 households. It was the 58th best rated program of that day. Game two produced a 0.4 national rating or 446,000 households, the 74th best rated program of that day, lower than the 2006 WNBA All-Star Game on ESPN which drew 447,000 households.

The move to NBC for the remainder of the finals did little to compensate for the series' limited drawing power. A perennial last among the Big Four American television networks, NBC was at the time going through an intense period of ratings turmoil, setting lowest rated week records in several viewing categories over the course of spring 2007.

Game three's coverage on NBC garnered a mere 1.1 rating (approximately 1,205,600 households), making it the lowest rated prime-time broadcast in the network's history. For comparison, game six of the NBA Eastern Conference Finals, broadcast opposite game three on cable channel TNT, achieved a 5.3 rating, approximately 5,808,800 households. Game four achieved a 1.9 rating (approximately 2,082,400 households), down 5 percent from game four the previous year. Game five received slightly less, 1.8 (approximately 1,972,800 households). As a whole, NBC's ratings for the championship series were down 20 percent from the previous season, making it the least watched finals in the United States.

At the time, Versus was only available to 50 percent of cable-equipped homes in the Los Angeles area, which hurt the buzz around the Ducks' playoff run in a traditionally crowded sports and entertainment market. Versus was the fifth-most watched cable network in the Los Angeles market for game one, good only for a 1.7 local rating.

Local numbers did improve as the series moved to free-to-air NBC. The Cup-clinching game five drew a 6.0 and a 12 share for an average audience of 496,000 viewers in the Los Angeles market, more than double that of a high-profile regular season game between baseball's Los Angeles Dodgers and San Diego Padres on KCAL 9 (3.0/5, 218,000 viewers). This symbolic, if short-lived, win over one of the region's flagship teams allowed the Ducks to close the series on a relatively high note, with the Los Angeles Times' Larry Stewart calling their final ratings performance "pretty good".

On the CBC, Hockey Night in Canada pulled in 2,608,000, 2,378,000, and 2,553,000 viewers for games one, two and three respectively, slightly higher than their numbers for equivalent games the previous year. This was the last finals that Bob Cole (play-by-play announcer) and Harry Neale (colour commentator) worked together. The following year, Cole worked with Greg Millen.

See also
2007 in ice hockey
2006–07 Anaheim Ducks season
2006–07 Ottawa Senators season

References

Further reading

 
Stanley Cup
Anaheim Ducks games
Ottawa Senators games
Stanley Cup Finals
2007 in sports in California
21st century in Anaheim, California
2000s in Ottawa
Stanley Cup
Ice hockey competitions in Ottawa
Sports competitions in Anaheim, California
Ice hockey competitions in California